Season 7 of the American competitive reality television series Hell's Kitchen aired on the Fox Network at 08:00pm (ET/PT) from June 1, 2010, to August 10, 2010. Gordon Ramsay returned as host, as well as Maître d' Jean-Philippe Susilovic and Blue Team Sous chef Scott Leibfried. Andi Van Willigan, a chef from Santa Monica, California became the sous chef for the Red Team.

Similar to Season 6, the winner and runner up avoided being nominated for elimination. This is the first season to featured the double elimination before the finals, and continued as a tradition on later seasons, except season 15 to 17, season 19 and 20, which return with normally single elimination before finals from the past six seasons. This season also  set a new record for three times teams restructuring.

Banquet chef Holli Ugalde won the season, she was promised to be the head chef position at Ramsay's newly renovated restaurant at the Savoy Hotel in London. Filming had concluded in February 2009, 16 months prior to seventh season premiere, when the hotel reopened in 2010; however, Ugalde was not given the job. Ramsay stated that the American Ugalde could not work in London due to visa problems, but Ugalde called that explanation an excuse, saying, "I don't know if they even applied for my visa."  Ugalde was later awarded an undisclosed amount of money in compensation and retained her title as the winner of season 7.

Autumn Lewis broke the record for most nominations in a season of Hell's Kitchen. The record was previously held by Virginia Dalbeck, who was nominated six times before finishing as the runner-up in Season 2. Lewis had been nominated a total of seven times throughout the season (one of which was voided by Chef Ramsay) before her elimination after the penultimate service.

Contestants
16 chefs competed in season 7.

Notes

Contestant progress

Episodes

Notes

References

Hell's Kitchen (American TV series)
2010 American television seasons